The Brain ( lit. "The Most Powerful Brain") is a Chinese scientific reality and talent show originating in Germany. The show's aim is to find people with exceptional brainpower. This show is produced under Endemol and has been sold to multiple countries in Europe, China, Russia and United States to date.

After four initial seasons, the series was rebooted as "最强大脑之燃烧吧大脑" ("The Brain: Burn Your Brain"), with a brand new concept and format, targeted at gathering teenage to adult contestants, and introducing a series of new puzzle-based games throughout the series. The newly formatted show has run yearly since 2018.

Unlike other game shows which emphasise high monetary prizes, no monetary prizes are awarded nor stressed in this program, as the show's sole aim is to find individuals who possess extraordinary mental skills. The Chinese version is the only weekly programme, unlike other one-off or annual format versions.

Overview and format

Seasons 1 & 2

Period One: Qualifier Rounds
A contestant with special skills (not necessarily brainpower or mental skills) comes to the stage and announces what their "special" challenge is going to be. Each judge (Except Dr. Wei) then gives a score between 0 and 5 based on how difficult they believe the challenge to be. The 3 judges' scores will then be added together to give the total preliminary score (between 0 and 15).

The contestant then completes their challenge. If they're successful, Dr. Wei gives a score between 1 and 10 based on the challenge's actual level of difficulty.

If the final score (the product of the judges' scores and Dr. Wei's score) is more than 80 points the contestant is qualified to go on to the next round. If Dr. Wei gives a full 10 points, the contestant is automatically qualified for the next round. If the final score is below 80, the contestant is eliminated from the show. Usually, Dr. Wei will give an explanation of his score, regardless if the contestant succeeds or is eliminated.

Period Two: Elimination Round
The contestants who received a full 10 points from Dr. Wei in Period One are exempt from elimination.

Before a challenger starts his/her brainpower-based challenge, they must choose a contestant who is already qualified to challenge. If the challenger does not state a specific qualified contestant they want to challenge, it will be seen as a challenge to all the qualified contestants.

If the challenger chooses only one qualified contestant, and their score is greater than the contestant being challenged, the challenger qualifies. However, if they score less than the qualified contestant, they are eliminated from the show. If the case of a tie occurs, Dr. Wei will ultimately decide who qualifies.

If the challenger wants to challenge all the qualified contestants, their score must be higher than the lowest score of the qualified contestants. If the challenger's score is higher than the lowest score of the already qualified contestants, the qualified contestants with scores below the challenger will face elimination by Dr. Wei's choice. If the challenger fails to reach the lowest qualified contestant score, they are eliminated from the show.

After Episode 9, China had found their 12 qualified contestants, who formed their team for international episodes.

Period Three: Challenges
This period consists of challenges between the Chinese show's greatest contestants and the ones in the other international versions (see below).

Each team has four members, participating in one-on-one competitions between team China and a foreign "high-skilled" team. Each team member plays one competition, and the country who wins the most is the winner. In the event of a tie, the four judges - Wei Kunlin, Robert Desimone, Konrad Kording and Bernard Balleine - will decide who wins the competition based on whose competition was the most difficult.

Note: In Season 1, Wei, Robert, Konrad and Bernard are all the experts of Neuroscience. Wei Kunlin is the Associate Professor of the Department of Psychology in Peking University, the Doctor of Motion Control at University of Pennsylvania; Robert Desimone is National Academy of Sciences Award and Golden Brain Award winner, the Professor of the Department of Brain and Cognitive Sciences of Massachusetts Institute of Technology; Konrad Kording is the Associate Professor of Northwestern University; Bernard Balleine is Honorary Fellow of Australia, the Director of Laboratory of Neurobehavioral Sciences of Institute for Brain and Mental in University of Sydney.

Full Schedule of Period Three
All these times are in Beijing Time(UTC+8).

Season 3

Phase 1: Captain selection 
In the premiere episode of Season 3, eight contestants from previous seasons will play head-to-head in four different competitions. Four winners will be allocated to the third phase, or the international competitions, as the captains.

Phase 2: International competitions 
A team of contestants from China will play head-to-head against a foreign team. Rules remain the same as the competitions in earlier seasons. The competition schedule will be shown as the following:

Only the winning team every week can select one contestant from their national team to the next phase - the season final in April.

Phase 3: Season final 
The advisory judge will nominate one contestant from those who have won the head-to-heads in the winning team at the end of each competition, as one of the four finalists. However, due to the fact that the third match between China and Japan ended with a tie, Robert Desimone nominated one contestant from both of the teams, meaning there would be five finalists in all. But Chen Ranran decided to withdraw, meaning the remaining four finalists would play as individuals in the final.

Each of the four finalists will take on the final challenge for them in the season. This challenge is based on their strengths in mental techniques, and it will be extremely harder than those they have been played earlier in the show. Regardless of the outcomes of the challenges, a panel of four experts (Wei Kunlin and three advisory judges from the head-to-heads) will all rate the challenge and explain it scientifically, as Wei Kunlin usually did earlier in the series. The contestant with the highest combined score is entitled the Grand Champion.

Season 4: Human vs Supercomputer 
The entire season four (2017 season) is based on the concept "Human vs supercomputer". Xiao Du, as an avatar of the Baidu AI system, would be recognised as a special contestant. However, if Xiao Du defeated any two human contestants on their nominated challenges, Xiao Du would be straightly qualified as a finalist, so it would be possible that there would be a non-human grand champion of the entire season. Competition structure is slightly different from the 2016 season.

Phase 1: Qualification 
Similar to the previous season's second phase, contestants have to achieve 80 points by the panel's decisions. One of the members of "The Brain's Hall of Fame" will join the judging panel, in order to select the best contestants. However, contestants cannot request head-to-heads against those who has already qualified until the next round.

"The Brain's Hall of Fame" consists of the contestants who successfully performed in the previous three seasons. As the previous season's grand champion, Chen Zhiqiang is guaranteed as a finalist to defend his title. If the contestant fail to qualify, the "Hall of Fame" may challenge the judging panel, but the decision must be unanimous in order to qualify. Should even one of the members did not challenge the judges, the contestant would be eliminated. As always, if the contestant failed to complete his or her challenge, he or she would be eliminated, cannot be qualified.

Also, there would be a special sudoku contest and mental calculation head-to-head competition, since there were no panellists in "The Brain's Hall of Fame" who specialise in either of these fields. They along with other panellists in the "Hall of Fame" who didn't have their nominated opponents would be straightly qualified for the third phase, in order to play head-to-head with international panellists.

Head-to-head 
In the second half of each episode, one member of "The Brain's Hall of Fame" will be nominated for the episode's head-to-head challenge against Xiao Du. To be fair, the details of their games would not be revealed to both the human contestants and Xiao Du itself before the recording of the show.

If there's a little time left (not enough due to regulations), it would be broadcast as a separate segment out of the regular show.

Special contests 
In Episodes 4 and 5, there were special contests based on speedcubing.

Auditions 
Starting from around 100 contestants, a non-broadcast audition was introduced, with contestants failed to solve a classic Rubik's Cube in a definite time limit were eliminated in first two rounds (e.g. in the speed solving round, 15 seconds in the first round, 12 seconds in the second), and the first six contestants to solve the third cube went on to the televised knockouts.

Last Man Standing 
Speed: In the televised knockouts, starting from the third round, the contestant with the longest cumulative time or committed a foul would be eliminated. The final two contestants play a best-of-five final to determine the winner that went through to Phase 2. Before each round, contestants may have 10 seconds to inspect the puzzle. Standard rules of speedcubing apply in each round.
Blindfolded: In the televised selection, starting with six contestants, they needed to solve three standard Rubik's cube blindfolded. Standard rules of speedcubing apply. Only the best of three rounds will be taken into account, while the two contestants with the longest time would be eliminated. Then the four remaining contestants repeated the previous round, with only two rounds in the following elimination round. The final two contestants then played a sudden death final to determine the winner that went through to next phase.

Odd One Out 
Since there was a contestant who specialise in mathematics and logic in Episode 5, there would be another head-to-head game to determine the only qualifier in the following episode, based on memory. Whoever won the "Odd One Out" game would be able to play against the chosen "Hall of Fame" panellist.

Phase 2: Knockout 
Qualified contestants in the previous phase will take on one of the members in the Hall of Fame under a head-to-head challenge designed by the production team. The winners will advance to the international challenges, while the losers are eliminated. Contestants cannot choose Xiao Du as the opponent until they win their head-to-heads.

Phase 3: China vs The World 
Panellists from "The Brains Hall of Fame" (as China) will play head-to-head games against one of the panellists from the panel The World. The World consists of nine contestants who were believed to be the best in their respective mental specialists, or from other international versions of The Brain.

After all the head-to-head games, regardless of the outcomes, Dr. Wei Kunlin and Prof. Robert Desimone will nominate one contestant from each of the two panels to proceed to the final along with the returning grand champion Chen Zhiqiang and Xiao Du.

Confirmed panellists from The World:
Alex Mullen, 2-time winner of World Memory Championships, champion of USA Memory Championship 2016
Yanjaa Wintersoul, #1 Female Memory Champion of the world and International Grandmaster of Memory World Memory Championships 2015
Jonas von Essen, returning from the previous season, 2-time winner of World Memory Championships, champion of Swedish Memory Championship 2014
Kota Morinishi, 2-time World Sudoku Championship winner, 7-time WSC veteran for Japan
Hiroaki Tsuchiya, returning from the 2016 season (finalist of the 2016 contest), Japan Mental Calculation champion
Marvin Wallonius, 2nd place overall in World Memory Championships 2015, currently holding three world records [5 minute (decimal) numbers, 15 minute abstract images, 30 minute binary numbers]
Johannes Zhou Zhang-wei, junior champion of South German Memory Championship 2013
Alisa Kellner, International Grandmaster of Memory, winner of the 2016 edition of Deutschlands Superhirn, the original German version of The Brain
Sylvain Arnoux, visual identification specialist; winner of Les Extra-ordinaires, the French version of The Brain

 Phase 4: The "Last Ever" Battle 
After all the nominations and competitions, two contestants nominated by scientific judges (acting as team leaders) along with returning grand champion Chen Zhiqiang will play games against Xiao Du for the last time of the series. However, they will work together as a team, instead of playing against each other.

After all the games, the judging panel will cast the deciding result and nominate the newest and last ever grand champion of The Brain.

Finalists:
Chen Zhiqiang, the returning grand champion of The Brain
Huang Zheng, stereoscopic vision specialist
Alex Mullen, memory specialist, 2-time World Memory Champion
Xiao Du, avatar of Baidu AI

 Summary of Season One 

 Period One's Qualified Contestants by Episode 

 Episode 1
This episode aired at 22:00 (Beijing Time) on January 3, 2014. This episode's guests were Li Yanhong and Jay Chou.

 Episode 2 
This episode aired at 22:00 (Beijing Time) on January 10, 2014.

 Episode 3 
This episode aired at 22:00 (Beijing Time) on January 17, 2014.

 Episode 4 
This episode aired at 22:00 (Beijing Time) on January 24, 2014.

 Episode 5 
This episode aired at 22:00 (Beijing Time) on February 7, 2014. Tao Ching-Ying was replaced by Zhang Ziyi for this episode.

Note: "Wang Feng" in this episode is not the singer, but a 24-year-old writer in Beijing; "Li Yong" is a 50-year-old man is currently living in Henan Province, not the former CCTV television host.

 Episode 6 
This episode aired at 22:00 (Beijing Time) on February 14, 2014.

 Episode 7 
This episode aired at 22:00 (Beijing Time) on February 21, 2014. This is the final episode of Period 1.

 Period Two's Qualified and Eliminated Formerly-qualified Contestants by Episode 

 Episode 8 
This episode aired at 22:00 (Beijing Time) on February 28, 2014. Jay Chou is back as the guest.

Eliminations in this episode: Ge Yunlin, Hu Xiaoling.

 Episode 9 
This episode aired at 22:00 (Beijing Time) on March 7, 2014. Meng Fei and Ning Caishen, the host and regular guest of Fei Cheng Wu Rao, a show currently airing every weekend on Jiangsu Television, were the guests. What's more, Ning replaced Liang Dong in this episode.

Eliminations in this episode: Rao Shunhan, Yang Wanli, Li Yong, Miki Yuk Kuen Lee.

 Brief Report to Period Three by Episode

 Episode 10 
This episode aired at 22:00 (Beijing Time, 14:00 in London, UK, 9:00 in New York City, USA) on March 14, 2014. The foreign contestants are from Italy, and all of those are winners of Superbrain - Le Supermenti(the Italian distribution of The Brain, running on Rai 1).

This episode's guest is Lin Dan, a world-famous Chinese badminton athlete and the advised judge is Robert Desimone, the Director of the McGovern Institute for Brain Research at Massachusetts Institute of Technology.Round 1: Franco tried to find the differences set by Zheng Caiqian 4 times, but he failed again and again in the 8-minute time limit; Zheng Caiqian's turn goes well, he found a difference at 6 minutes and 17.02 seconds so he won Round 1.Round 2: Both of the contestants faced three glasses of water, they must calculate how much water in these glasses in grams (They had a margin of 3 grams). Marco's answer was 276 g, actually 273.7 g; but Yang's answer was 498 g, the actual answer was 493.6 g. Marco won Round 2.Round 3: They faced a random sequence of brides and bridegrooms, with a total of 102 people in the line. Li started from the right side, and Andrea from the left side. Li finished in 1 minute and 18.15 seconds, while Andrea used 2 minutes and 41.51 seconds. Under huge pressure, Andrea was totally correct. Li remembered the sequence correctly but thought he placed the models in the wrong order. Li cried, repeating these words:

When the judges went through Li's actual sequence, they found that Li actually placed them correctly.  Li therefore won Round 3.Round 4: Prior to the final competition, Robert said that he wanted to add 10 simple maths questions to prevent the contestants from memorizing the numbers directly, because "that is not difficult enough" (said Wu, Wei and Robert). Matteo wanted 10 seconds to memorize the number pyramid, and he got the pyramid incorrect with 4 wrong numbers. Then was Wu's turn, he only wanted 6 seconds to memorize the pyramid, and Wei said that he was "not wise enough" backstage, though Wu  had been crowned at the World Memory Championships. Finally, Wu got the pyramid correct, and he won Round 4.Ultimate winner: China won Episode 10, the first episode of competition series.

 Episode 11 
This episode aired at 22:00 (Beijing Time, 14:00 in London, UK, 9:00 in New York City, USA) on March 21, 2014. The foreign contestants are from Spain, and all of those are winners of Increíbles: el gran desafío(the Spanish distribution of The Brain, running on Antena 3).

That night's guests are: Cecilia Cheung, a Chinese actress, singer, two-time Hong Kong Film Awards winner; the other one is Kim Soo-hyun, a Korean actor, Korean Movie Bell Award winner in 2013, the starring of Asian-hit Television series My Love from the Star. The advised judge is Konrad Kording, the Associate Professor of Northwestern University.Round 5: They faced 20 models, after the models dressed in the costumes chosen by Cecilia Cheung and Kim Soo-hyun. Later they both chose one model for each of the contestants. Liu chose the costumes faster than Paco, but Paco got 2 of 5 costumes correct. Finally, it was shown that Liu got just one of the costumes incorrect, so Liu won Round 5.Round 6: The pair of contestants memorized the 150 Barcodes backstage for 3 hours, then they faced the first code. They both got the codes correct. But in the second codes, Huang's pen was found it had something wrong, but Konrad gave the two another try. Finally, Huang did the extra challenge correct within just approximately 19 seconds. Huang won the Round 6.Round 7: The first turn was Sun Cheran's turn. She played "Single Dragon Sudoku" with her back to the screen. She had to fill 1 to 9 into the Sudoku grid, and the numbers couldn't be repeated in any of the lines or the small 3x3 grids, and in the "dragon" chosen by Matin, the numbers must be in a strictly increasing or decreasing order (starting with 1 or 9). Sun got the grid correct.

Then it was Martin's turn: following the chessboard of Chess and its Knight's rules, Sun must assign the starting point and the ending point, with a number of starting point's number and the sum of each horizontal and vertical line between 200 to 500. Sun chose A5 as the starting point with the number of 31, and B5 as the finish point. The sum of numbers in all the lines must be exactly 477. Matin also got it correct. Ultimately, Konrad, the judge, decided that Martin was the winner of Round 7.Round 8: Both of the contestants memorized the 20 Rubik's Cubes in one hour backstage, and on the stage, they must solve the series of 20 cubes in 10 minutes. Alex used 7 minutes and 44 seconds to deal with the cubes but only got five correct. Jia used full 10 minutes and got 13 cubes correct, so he ultimately won final Round 8.Ultimate winner: China won the 11th episode by 3-1.

 Episode 12 
This episode is aired at 21:30 (Beijing Time, 13:30 in London, UK, 8:30 in New York City, USA) on March 28, 2014. The foreign contestants are from Germany, and all of those are best ever contestants of Deutschlands Superhirn(the German distribution of The Brain, formerly running on ZDF).

This is the finale of the 2014 Chinese version of The Brain franchise.

Jay Chou is back again as guest. The advised judge is Bernard Balleine, a Laureate Fellow of Australia and Director of the Laboratory of Neurobehavioral Sciences in the Brain and Mind Research Institute in the University of Sydney.Round 9: They faced 400 dice in 100 cups, each had 4 dice in it. They memorized them, within 5 seconds for each cup. After memorizing the numbers, they were asked to name the numbers under five randomly selected cups. Both got all of the numbers asked correct. As the tie-breaker round, they had to repeat 20 further numbers of five further dice cups by writing on a board as fast as they can. Boris achieves this in just 20.9 seconds and is faster than Wang. However, Boris got one single number wrong; Wang repeated all of them correctly. Wang won Round 9.Round 10: They faced the following math questions:
(1) 6,901×7,789=53,751,889 (Zhou); 571×857=489,347 (Rudiger)
(2) 713=96,889,010,407 (Zhou); 9317=2,912,125,755,884,410,842,622,249,257,854,493 (Rudiger)
(3) 5√7,813,624,454,316,229=1,508.5875…(Zhou); 4√83=3.018349479…(Rudiger)
Tie occurred after the three rounds. They both got their strongest question incorrect with a minor error. In the final questions in 10th round, Zhou's question was chossing which of 27,637 and 28,283 was prime, and his answer 28,283 was correct (27,637=29×953); Rudiger's question was sin 289°, and his answer was "-0.94518575…" (also correct). As a tie-breaker, Bernard decided that Rudiger was the winner of Round 10.Round 11: Two judges gave Ai and Dave the same 4 objects. Ai used 2 minutes and 37.40 seconds to find the objects using her breath, while Dave finished in 2 minutes and 45.51 seconds using sound waves. Both of them got the first two correct and the third wrong. However, Ai got more objects correct, she won the 11th round.Round 12: They both memorized 3-D Chinese world-famous painting Along the River During the Qingming Festival before the show started filming for two hours. In the first two questions, they both got a location correct according to the judges' choices. In the final question, Ni chose the correct location of a character in the sandbox, so Ni won the final round.Ultimate winner: Rumors online came that China was the ultimate winner, but its source can not be determined. During the season finale, the winner was revealed to be China. The first season said goodbye to the Chinese audience in this episode. The victory ceremony was aired on Jiangsu TV after the show ended.

 Controversies & criticism in and after Season 1 

 "Blind Sudoku" 
In Episode 8, Sun Cheran, the 14-year-old contestant from Beijing, challenged playing Sudoku blind. Several hours after the show aired, Chinese netizens mainly from social network Sina Weibo criticized the show, saying that her challenge was not difficult enough.

The people online said that she only completed one "easy" Sudoku, because the numbers of the Sudoku table were the repetition of numbers '1, 2, 3', '5, 6, 7' and '4, 8, 9' in various orders, since Jay Chou filled one single number and one single color in the grid.

Chen Cen, the captain and head coach of the national Sudoku team of China, later said that Sun Cheran was qualified to stay in the show, the main reason being that her ability is more than enough to challenge the Europeans. Even more, Chen Cen clarified that in the other version, there were many contestants similar to Sun.

 "Guiding the way of flyover" 
One week after Sun's performance, Li Yunlong qualified with the challenge of "Guiding the way of flyover." On March 8, 2014, just one day after the show aired, Wei Kunlin said these words on his Sina Weibo:

However, Wei's comments were strongly criticized by online viewers.

 Kim Soo-hyun's visit 
A major controversy was Kim Soo-hyun's visit to this show. Some media reports said that Jiangsu Television dispatched a charter flight to send Kim from Seoul, South Korea to Nanjing, where the show was taped. Accordingly, an entourage of security guards were hired, and public security departments in Jiangsu Province and Nanjing mobilized more than 300 police officers to ensure the safety of the studio.  Other media reported that Kim's visit's appearance fee is about three million Chinese yuan (KR₩521,319,010, US$ 488,520, €352,110, GB£ 293,249, HK$3,791,524 or 10,299,462,628 ₫; sponsored by Google Finance).   Kim's trip was heavily criticized by netizens in China, for being overtly extravagant.  However, a group of fans of Kim published a full-page advertisement in Chosun Ilbo in both Chinese and Korean in support of Kim.

 Series controversies to episode 10 
Minutes after Episode 10 finished, the online viewers had noted several controversies in Team China's performance.

In Round 4, Wu got a question wrong. He accidentally wrote: "18+99= 107."

The correct answer was 117. However, the rules didn't claim that getting the question wrong means the challenge is over. The "certified" online viewers said as follows:

 Acting as a drama? 
Some online viewers criticized that the foreign contestants "surrendered" in the competitions on the social networks, or the Chinese contestants were "cheating." They called into question the production team, and that all these episodes were making the broadcasting effects, so that they made all the three episodes into 3-1 results.

 Excessive consumption after shows 
It was reported that the host Jiang along with some contestants in the show are facing the heated consumption among the Chinese merchants. For example, Yang Wanli, the show's contestant in Episode 2, has taken a lot of local lectures about memorizing objects and brainpower; Jiang Changjian, the presenter and Associated Professor in Fudan University, is determined to take a lecture in Xiamen, Fujian, his hometown on May 17, 2014.

Online viewers also felt sympathy that the contestants, the host and even the co-hosts (known as "Scientific Assistants") were all facing the "excessive consumption" after the show ended in the early months of 2014, while criticizing the "wealthy" merchants' consumption.

 Summary of Season Two 

 Period One's qualified contestants by episode 

 Episode 1
This episode was aired at 21:10 (Beijing Time) on January 2, 2015. This premiere episode's celebrity guest was actress Fan Bingbing.

On the opening show of Season 2, host Jiang Changjian revealed that the contestants in the Period Three later this season were from United States, United Kingdom, Japan, etc. This season also consists of challenges performed outside the studio, for instance, one contestant took the task in Hong Kong. Only one contestant was qualified in this episode.

 Episode 2
This episode was aired at 21:10 (Beijing Time) on January 9, 2015. This episode's celebrity guest was actress Shu Qi.

--Bao Yun later was unable to find a contestant who could challenge him, so he did not participate in the challenge against other country teams.

 Episode 3
This episode was aired at 21:10 (Beijing Time) on January 16, 2015. This episode's celebrity guest was actor Tong Dawei, as one of the judges.

 Episode 4
This episode was aired at 21:10 (Beijing Time) on January 23, 2015. Mandopop icon Jay Chou was back for the fourth time in total, and Ning Jing was also one of the celebrity guests.

 Episode 5
This episode was aired at 21:10 (Beijing Time) on January 30, 2015. This episode's celebrity guest was actress Tong Liya.

 Episode 6
This episode was aired at 21:10 (Beijing Time) on February 6, 2015. This episode was the last show of the qualifier rounds.

Note: Due to personal requests, Sze Wai Ho (scored out) withdrew from the competition later on.

 Period Two's qualified and eliminated contestants by episode 
Note: Eliminated contestants were scored out in the tables below. If the challenge was rated lower than the original score, it could be considered as an automatic elimination.

 Episode 7 
This episode was aired at 21:10 (Beijing Time) on February 13, 2015. Xu Jinglei was the celebrity guest that night.

 Episode 8 
This episode was aired at 21:10 (Beijing Time) on February 27, 2015. Actress Li Xiaolu was the celebrity guest that night.

 Brief report to Period Three by episode 

 Episode 9: China vs. Germany 
This episode was aired at 21:10 (Beijing Time) on March 6, 2015. Pianist Lang Lang was the celebrity guest that night. This episode also saw the return of Prof. Robert Desimone, as one of the judges.Round 1: As the first round of the "Three heads against Four" Challenges, both of the contestants faced a random deck of playing cards. Their job was memorizing it and put it into a correct order. Wang Feng, as the only Asian winner of World Memory Championships, memorized the deck in 19.80 seconds, while Simon, German Memory Master of 2009 and Worldrecord holder used a little more time than Wang. Simon made some mistakes, and Wang Feng recalled the full deck correctly within 5-minute time limit. Wang won this round.Round 2: The contestants memorized the 100 random audience members with their names (in first letters for given names and surnames), and their appearance in the front only. Then they faced 3 side silhouettes chosen by Lang Lang. Contestants must identify those silhouettes belong to whom, and write down their first letters for the names and surnames, and their random seat numbers. Li Lu finished first with an advantage of about 1 minute and 10 seconds. However, Christiane gave one incorrect answer to the second audience member's seat number, making Li Lu became the winner.Round 3: The contestants was given three household objects. The co-presenter made these objects some noises, but the contestants must name the hidden piano key sounds in such noises, then write down what they have heard. Sun Yiting's answer was closer to the judgement of the spectrum, making Sun Yiting became the third round's winner.Round 4: During the final round, Boris and Wang Feng faced the challenge they competed last year. Boris did his best even to score one point for the German team. In the last cup of dice, Wang Feng gave the correct answer. However, Boris failed to recall the numbers in the cup Number 93.Ultimate winner: China won the first competition in 2015 edition with a score of 4-0.

 Episode 10: China vs. Japan 
This episode was aired at 21:10 (Beijing Time) on March 13, 2015. Prof. Robert Desimone stayed on the seat for the task as a judge.

 Round 5: Two contestants faced the same 100 Rubik's Cubes in various shapes. Their task was to solve all the cubes, whoever solves faster won. Mitsuki finished first with an advantage of one and a half minutes, and became the winner of this round. It is worth noticing that Mitsuki is the current Guinness World Record holder of the person who solves a 3x3 Rubik's Cube fastest, and his record was only about 7 seconds.Round 6: Two similar pictures from China and Japan (one from each respective country) was divided into 100 fans each. They must identify the three fans chosen by Robert by showing the edges of those closed fans, in other words, the fans were kept closed when the competition is underway. Before the competition, they could memorize and keep them familiar with the 200 fans for 2 hours, however, Wang decided not to watch ANY of the fans. During the competition, Wang finished the task first, and he got all the answer correctly. But Haraguchi failed to identify two of the fans, Wang won this round.Round 7: As the tie-breaking round and the "Two-on-two" round, the score would be doubled. In this round, there was three sub-rounds. In the first two rounds, the credits will be rated by the difficulty they chose on the difficulty board. The contestant correctly answered the most difficult question would score six points, and four points for the second most difficult, then two and one for the rest of contestants. However, getting the answer wrong would score nothing (zero points) in each of the first two sub-rounds.
 1) All the contestants must solve the questions that has 20 numbers to be added flashing on the screen. They could choose how quick they wanted. In this round, Wu started first, he chose the difficulty that could keep him safe for the competition. Next two contestants, Xiang and Tsujikubo chose the same difficulty level rated 7 out of 10, and they answered those sums correctly. Finally, Sasano chose the highest level of difficulty (8 out of 10), and got the correct answer as well. In this sub-round, Japan was in the lead with a score of 9-4 (Round 7 only).
 2) To increase the difficulty, there were two sets of double digit numbers (10 numbers each) to be added flashing on the screen. The contestants must correctly work out both of the answers to score points. However, Japanese contestants started first, and Tsujikubo got the 5-star question (addition only, 6 seconds for showing the numbers) correct. Then Wu and Sasano correctly got the same level (6 out of possible 10) of question. At last, Xiang answered the most difficult one (7 out of 10, addition only for 4 seconds), and he correctly worked out those sums. After two sub-rounds, Japanese contestants lead with 15-11.
 3) In the final round, there were four questions for multiplication and division (at least five-digit numbers used). Those questions worth 2, 4, 6, 6 points, and all the questions were on the buzzer. The first pair of contestants buzz-in with the correct answer would score points, but if the contestant got the question wrong, the respective points would be taken away from the total. In the first question (9-digit ÷ 5-digit), Wu Renjun was the first to buzz-in and correctly answered that. But in the second round (6-digit × 6-digit) worth four points, Tsujikubo incorrectly solved that, and as a result, those four points were taken away from the Japanese contestants' score. In the final two rounds (12-digit ÷ 6-digit and 7-digit × 7-digit), Tsujikubo had taken control of the whole competition, and under such massive pressure, she got both of them correct. Japanese contestants won the "Double pointer" Round 7 with a massive score of 23-11.Ultimate winner: Japan became the first team to defeat the "undefeated" Chinese contestants with a result of 3-1.

 Episode 11: China vs. United Kingdom 
This episode was aired at 21:10 (Beijing Time) on March 20, 2015. This episode saw the return of the contestant Li Lu, who appeared on the competition two weeks (on television) ago. This show's celebrity guests were Huang Lei, a Chinese actor, and a regular guest of If You Are the One, a weekly dating show presented by one of the judges Meng Fei; and actress Shu Qi for the second time in the series. The advisory judge this time was Dagnar Sternad, PhD of experimental psychology in University of Connecticut, professor of biology and physics at Northeastern University, and visiting professor of Massachusetts Institute of Technology.Round 8: This round was exactly the same as what Lin did in the qualifier round for this season. However, in this round, two contestants would play against each other. The person who takes a shorter amount of time to calculate the security code hidden in the wall featuring 1,380 codes wins. To decrease the possibility of guessing the answers, the three strikes rule was used - if the contestant fails to input the correct code, the competition ends immediately and he loses. The correct code was hidden in the crossing of four of the possible seven prime numbers. In the competition, Robert went faster and won the Round 8. The number 67,971 is a composite number rather than a prime number which was chosen in the qualifier round; it is divisible by 3 (67,971 = 3 × 139 × 163).Round 9: This round consisted of recalling more than 1,000 words in 8 non-Latin-based languages: the competition used Arabic, Persian, Burmese, Cambodian, Nepali, Thai, Sinhala and Tamil. They had to memorize all those words before the show, and in the competition, all those words would be split into thousands of pieces. They must find the correct pieces on the board to complete the translated words (two words for three languages each) in 40 minutes. Li Wei completed the round first to apply pressure to Katie, but in the competition, Katie got two more correct answers than Li Wei. As a result, Chinese contestants lost two straight rounds.Ultimate winner: United Kingdom won the competition with a result of 3-1, which means the Chinese contestants have lost two shows in a row.

 Episode 12: China vs. United States Ultimate winner:''' China won the competition with a result of 2-1, which means the Chinese contestants have won two out of four competitions.

 Controversies & criticism in and after Season 2 
 Wang Yuheng: Political references 
In the 10th episode of the second season, facing the Japanese contestants, Chinese contestant Wang Yuheng said to the camera:

Wang's such words and the number 300,000 made a huge controversy on the social media, because it was the number of victims in Nanking Massacre two years before World War II, and the show was filmed in Nanjing, China. Wang stressed on the references of history and politics, made him became controversial after the show.

 Summary of Season Four 

 Phase 1's Qualified Contestants by Episode 

 Episode 1 
This episode aired on January 6, 2017. Episode 1's guest judge was Zhang Ziyi.  

 Hall of Fame vs. Xiao Du 

 Episode 2 
This episode aired on January 13, 2017. Episode 2's guest judge was Jay Chou.  

 Hall of Fame vs. Xiao Du 

 Episode 3 
This episode aired on January 20, 2017. Episode 3's guest judge was Fu Yuanhui.  

 Hall of Fame vs. Xiao Du 

 Episode 4 
This episode aired on February 3, 2017. Episode 4's guest judge was Zhang Ziyi.  

 Episode 5 
This episode aired on February 10, 2017. Episode 5's guest judge was Zhang Ziyi.  

 Episode 6 
This episode aired on February 17, 2017. Episode 6's guest judge was Wu Minxia.  

 Phase Two's head-to-head contests by episode 
Starting Episode 7, each incumbent and challenger competed for one seat on the international team in a total of nine head-to-head contests.

 Episode 7 
This episode aired on February 24, 2017.   

 Side note: Due to the fact that Jia Liping committed cheating in his head-to-head, Jia Liping, Lin Kaijun, Wang Yinghao, and Wang Jiayu were removed from the team.

 Episode 8 
This episode aired on March 3, 2017.   

 Episode 9 
This episode aired on March 10, 2017.   

Episode 10
This episode aired on March 17, 2017.

Episode 11
This episode aired on March 24, 2017.

Episode 12
This episode aired on March 31, 2017.

The Grand Final
In the last ever show of The Brain, the judging panel decided that:

Following that statement, the long-time presenter Prof. Jiang Changjian concluded the entire series with these words, which have been translated into English:

Therefore, Sang Jie, the executive producer of The Brain announced that the show won't be renewed for a fifth season, according to contestant Bao Yun's weibo. Presenter Jiang Changjian also confirmed that shortly after the recording of the final show. The official weibo then resigned, with just one word "GOODBYE".

Notable contestants chronology
Domestic
These contestants made appearances in multiple seasons of The Brain as contestants. Only those who have qualified in the qualifier round or have been a member of "The Brain's Hall of Fame" will count. 

Note: Due to the fact that Sun Yiting received campus violence exclusively for him since he became a notable contestant on the programme, Sun immigrated to Australia with the local citizenship in 2017.

International
These international contestants played in multiple seasons of The Brain.

Other notable mentions include Rüdiger Gamm who is known as ‘the human calculator’.

 Judges 
Scientific judge in all seasons of the original series is Wei Kunlin.

 Season 1 

 Season 2 

 Season 3 

 Season 4 

 Celebrity Guests 

 Season 1 

Note: The celebrity guests as judges and contestants are not included in the list.

 Season 3 

Note: Sun Rui, a member of SNH48, is featured as a co-presenter throughout the season.

 Season 4: Human vs Supercomputer 

 Transmissions 
 Regular series 

Reformatted series: 最强大脑之燃烧吧大脑

International versions

 International broadcast 
Season 1 is also broadcast in Singapore on Mediacorp Channel U. In Singapore, this show has aired every Tuesday at 20:00, starting from July 15, 2014. Again, Season 2 was also broadcast in the same channel since September 2015, 20:30, the same goes to NTV7 of Malaysia, who also broadcast Season 3 and Season 4.

Reruns of the inaugural season are currently broadcasting in Australia every Sunday on SBS 2, commencing on January 24, 2016.

 See also 
Brain
Human brain
Similar television programmes:The Big Brain Theory, 2013, Discovery ChannelBeat the Brain'', 2015, BBC Two

References

External links

2014 Chinese television series debuts
2017 Chinese television series endings
Jiangsu Television original programming
Chinese game shows